Robert Alfred Corbett (born 14 December 1938) was a member of the House of Commons of Canada from 1978 to 1993. His background was in business.

Corbett was born in Saint John, New Brunswick, was the son of James Ross Corbett and Helen Elma Yeamans. In  1971, he married Laverne Dorothea Stewart. Corbett represented Queens South in the Legislative Assembly of New Brunswick from 1974 to 1978.

He was first elected to the House of Commons in a by-election on 16 October 1978 at the Fundy—Royal electoral district for the Progressive Conservative party. He served consecutive terms in the 30th, 31st, 32nd, 33rd and 34th Canadian Parliaments until his defeat in the 1993 federal election at the hands of the Liberal Party's Paul Zed.

Electoral history

External links
 

1938 births
Living people
Progressive Conservative Party of Canada MPs
Members of the House of Commons of Canada from New Brunswick
Progressive Conservative Party of New Brunswick MLAs
Politicians from Saint John, New Brunswick